Robert Fealey Morneau (born September 10, 1938) is an American prelate of the Roman Catholic Church. Morneau served as an auxiliary bishop of the Diocese of Green Bay from 1978 to 2013.

Biography

Early life 
The fourth of six children, Robert Morneau was born on September 10, 1938, in New London, Wisconsin, to Leroy and Catherine (Fealey) Morneau. After graduating from Bear Creek High School, he studied at St. Norbert College in De Pere, Wisconsin, and Sacred Heart School of Theology in Hales Corner, Wisconsin. Morneau then entered Catholic University of America in Washington, D.C., where he earned both bachelor and masters degrees.

Priesthood 
Morneau was ordained to the priesthood for the Diocese of Green Bay by Bishop John Grellinger on May 28, 1966.

After his ordination, Morneau worked as an assistant pastor at a parish in New London, Wisconsin.  He then took appointments in Manitowoc, Wisconsin, where he served as a faculty member at Silver Late College. and chaplain at the University of Wisconsin–Green Bay, Manitowoc Campus and Park Town Home. He has also taught at the Summer Theological Institute of St. Norbert College and served on the college's board of trustees.

Auxiliary Bishop of Green Bay 
On December 19, 1978, Pope John Paul II appointed Morneau as an auxiliary bishop of the Diocese of Green Bay and titular bishop of Massa Lubrense. He was consecrated at St. Francis Xavier Cathedral in Green Bay on February 22, 1979, by Bishop Aloysius Wycislo, with Bishops Mark Schmitt and John Grellinger serving as co-consecrators.

Morneau served the diocese as a member of the college of consultors and the diocesan Finance Council; as the vicar for priests and the vicar general; and as pastor of Resurrection Parish in Allouez, Wisconsin.

In 1979, a family complained to Morneau that their child had been sexually abused by David Boyea, a parish priest. The family only asked for an apology from Boyea, which Morneau obtained. Morneau did not report the allegations to police or to the public. In 1985, Boyea pleaded guilty to first degree sexual assault of a different child and was sentenced to ten years in prison. In 1986, a $12 million civil suit was filed against Morneau and the diocese by three of Boyea's victims. The diocese eventually settled with the victims. In 1990, Boyea was released from prison and was laicized by the Vatican. I

Retirement and legacy 

On September 10, 2013, Morneau turned 75, the retirement age at which bishops must submit a retirement request to the Vatican. On October 7, 2013, Pope Francis accepted his retirement. On September 14, 2018, the Vatican granted Morneau's request to withdraw from public ministry. In a statement, Morneau cited his failure to report Boyea to police in 1979. In a statement, Morneau said:I failed to report to local authorities an incident of abuse of a minor by a priest in 1979 and, as a result, this priest was able to abuse again several years later. I intend to spend my time in prayer for all victims and survivors of sexual abuse and I will do corporal works of mercy in reparation for what I failed to do.

See also

 Catholic Church hierarchy
 Catholic Church in the United States
 Historical list of the Catholic bishops of the United States
 List of Catholic bishops of the United States
 Lists of patriarchs, archbishops, and bishops

References

External links
Roman Catholic Diocese of Green Bay Official Site

1938 births
Living people
20th-century American Roman Catholic titular bishops
People from New London, Wisconsin
Writers from Wisconsin
Religious leaders from Wisconsin
Catholic University of America alumni
Roman Catholic Diocese of Green Bay
21st-century American Roman Catholic titular bishops
American male writers
Catholics from Wisconsin